John R. Mott High School, or Postville Jr/Sr High School, is a public high school in Postville, Iowa. The school is part of the Postville Community School District. Its mascot is the Postville Pirate.

Athletics
The Pirates compete in the Upper Iowa Conference in the following sports:

Cross Country
Volleyball
Football
Basketball
Wrestling
Track and Field 
Golf 
Soccer
Baseball 
 1992 Class 2A State Champions 
Softball

References

Sources 
 Archived Official Website

External links
 Official website

See also
List of high schools in Iowa

Public high schools in Iowa
Schools in Allamakee County, Iowa